The Intel Compute Stick was a stick PC designed by Intel to be used in media center applications. According to Intel, it is designed to be smaller than conventional desktop or other small-form-factor PCs, while offering comparable performance. Its main connector, an HDMI 1.4 port, along with a compatible monitor (or TV) and Bluetooth-based keyboards and mice, allows it to be used for general computing tasks.

The small form factor device was launched in early 2015 using the Atom Z3735F power-efficient processor from Intel's Bay Trail family, a SoC family that is predominantly designed for use with tablets and 2-in-1 devices. The processor offers 1.33 GHz processor base frequency and a maximum RAM of 2 GB. This is sufficient for home entertainment usage, light office productivity, thin clients, and digital signage applications.

In mid-2015 it was announced that second generation versions of the Compute Stick would feature advancements on the Bay Trail framework through application of Core M processors in the form factor. The new devices (released Q1 2016) allowed Intel to introduce additional processing power as well as 4 GB memory for "more intensive application and content creation" as well as "faster multi-tasking".

The Intel Compute stick line was discontinued in June 2020.

Versions

Notes
1. Additionally, the three models of the STCK1A32WFC family differ in the list of countries issuing regulatory approval for their sale.

References

External links 

 Introducing the Intel Compute Stick

Intel
Single-board computers